Jessica Rosemary Frances Mills, commonly known as Jess Mills, is an English singer/songwriter and musician, currently signed to Island Records, who has collaborated with many UK electronic music producers including Photek, Distance and Breakage.

Early life and career
Mills grew up in Kentish Town, North London. She is the daughter of Labour MP Tessa Jowell and lawyer David Mills, and attended Acland Burghley School; there, she met Niomi McLean-Daley, better known as Ms. Dynamite, becoming friends and, "doing dodgy dance routines in assembly together."

After graduating from Sussex University, Mills began working in a local pub to fund a continued interest in music on the side. After a steady string of collaborations with various musicians throughout the 2000s (including one with Dom Search from The Nextmen) she eventually got her real break touring with Leftfield in 2010.

She has worked extensively with producer Breakage, scoring a UK top 40 hit with the track "Fighting Fire".

Other tracks released in 2011 include the singles "Vultures" and "Live For What I Die For", as well as a cover of The Cure's "A Forest" (of which Robert Smith himself has admitted he is a fan).

She has attracted interest from the press including a feature to run in i-D magazine.

Her debut album, titled "Twist of Fate" was originally set to be released on 28 January 2013, but due to her label's poor promotion of "For My Sins", the album was pushed back and ultimately shelved. Since her departure from Island Records, she has signed with Warner/Chappell Music. Her first release with this label is a free download of Sweet Love, an original song that incorporates lyrics from Anita Baker's song of the same name.

She has supported Scottish singer-songwriter Emeli Sandé on her Our Version of Events Tour, after performing alongside Sandé, Annie Lennox & Katy B at an EQUALS live concert. Mills released her fourth single "For My Sins" on 14 September 2012 ahead of the release of her later-cancelled album Twist of Fate

In 2015, Mills made a return under the moniker "SLO" and has since released two EP's. On 15 March 2019 she released the single 'Temporary Madness' as the first single from her debut album "Solace", released on 12 April.

Mills also works for the charity Help Refugees.

Discography

Studio albums
 Twist of Fate (Cancelled)
 Solace (as SLO) (2019)

Extended plays
 SLO (2015)
 Atone (2016)

Singles

As featured artist

References

External links

Year of birth missing (living people)
Living people
English women in electronic music
English women singer-songwriters
Daughters of barons
21st-century English women singers
21st-century English singers
Dubstep musicians
People from Kentish Town
Singers from London
Alumni of the University of Sussex